The golden triangle is an informal Finnish-English term for the area of southwestern Finland between the cities of Helsinki, Turku, and Tampere where most of the country's population, arable land, and GDP is done.

External links 
 Half of Finland's regions experience natural net population loss, Helsingin Sanomat

Regions of Finland
Geography of Finland